Huilong is a town of Gaoping District, Nanchong, Sichuan, People's Republic of China, situated  east-northeast of downtown Nanchong. , it has one residential community (社区) and ten villages under its administration.

See also 
 List of township-level divisions of Sichuan

References 

Towns in Sichuan
Nanchong